The Lonei Household is an 1880 play by the German writer Adolphe L'Arronge.

References

Bibliography
 Grange, William. Historical Dictionary of German Theater. Rowman & Littlefield, 2015.

1880 plays
Plays by Adolphe L'Arronge